Methyltransferase-like protein 13 is an enzyme that in humans is encoded by the METTL13 gene.

References

Further reading